The Borg–McEnroe rivalry was a tennis rivalry between Björn Borg and John McEnroe, who met 14 times on the regular tour and 22 times in total between November 1978 and April 1981. Their head-to-head was even at 7-7. Their on-court rivalry was highlighted by their contrasting temperaments and playing styles: the Swede Borg was known for his cool and emotionless demeanor on court, while the American McEnroe was famed for his court-side tantrums. Because of this, their rivalry was described as "Fire and Ice".

In 1980 McEnroe reached the singles final at Wimbledon for the first time, where he faced Borg, who was aiming for an Open Era record fifth consecutive Wimbledon title. At the start of the final McEnroe was booed by the crowd as he entered Centre Court following his heated exchanges with officials during his semi-final clash with Jimmy Connors. In a fourth set tie-breaker that lasted 20 minutes, McEnroe saved five match points (seven altogether in that set) and eventually won 18–16. However, he was unable to break Borg's serve in the fifth set and Borg went on to win 8–6. This match is widely considered one of the best tennis matches ever played. McEnroe defeated Borg at the US Open final the same year in five sets.

In 1981 McEnroe returned to Wimbledon and again faced Borg in the singles final. This time it was the American who prevailed and defeated Borg to end the Swede's run of 41 straight match victories at the All England Club. At the US Open in the same season, McEnroe was again victorious, winning in four sets, afterwards Borg walked off the court and out of the stadium before the ceremonies and press conference had begun. Borg retired shortly afterwards, having never won the US Open despite reaching four finals. Their final confrontation came in 1983 in Tokyo at the Suntory Cup (invitational tournament), with Borg prevailing in three sets.

After their retirements, Borg and McEnroe grew a more friendly relationship. In March 2006, when Bonhams Auction House in London announced that it would auction Borg's Wimbledon trophies and two of his winning rackets on 21 June 2006, McEnroe called from New York and told Borg, "What's up? Have you gone mad?" The conversation with McEnroe, along with pleas from Jimmy Connors and Andre Agassi, eventually persuaded Borg to buy out the trophies from Bonhams at an undisclosed amount.

Head-to-head

Official matches (14)

Borg 7 – McEnroe 7

Breakdown of their rivalry
All matches: (14 ) Tied 7–7
All finals: McEnroe 5–4
Hard courts: McEnroe 3–1
Carpet courts: Borg 5–3
Grass courts: Tied 1–1
Grand Slam matches: McEnroe 3–1
Grand Slam finals: McEnroe 3–1
Masters matches: Borg 2–0
Masters finals: None
Davis Cup matches: None
WCT Finals matches: McEnroe 1–0

Other matches

Invitational matches

Borg–McEnroe (4–4)

Exhibitions 

Borg–McEnroe (2–1)

See also
 Borg vs McEnroe – movie
 Borg–Connors rivalry
 Lendl–McEnroe rivalry
 List of tennis rivalries

References

External links
 Borg-McEnroe head-to-head at the main ATP tour

Björn Borg
John McEnroe
Tennis rivalries
Sports rivalries in the United States